Student Human Rights Ordinance is an ordinance in operation in some cities and provinces in South Korea. It first began in Gyeonggi-do Province (2010) and expanded to Gwangju (2011), Seoul (2012), and the Jeollabuk-do Province (2013) (North Jeolla Province). The primary objective of the ordinance is to extend human rights protection for students and youth in South Korea.

Distinctions Between Ordinances

The four ordinances are very similar, but some are more limited in what they include. The Gyeonggi-do Student Human Rights Ordinance and Seoul Ordinance of Student Rights are the only two to include the right not to be discriminated against on the basis of pregnancy. The most contentious items have been the rights concerning gender and sexual diversity. The Seoul ordinance as well as the Gyeonggi-do ordinance include sexual orientation and gender identity. Gwangju ordinance only includes sexual orientation and Jeollabuk-do only includes gender equality. Seoul, Jeollabuk-do and Gyeonggi-do each dedicate a day to celebrate Student Human Rights Day in efforts to expand interest and participation in the human rights of the student. Gwangju has not created a day devoted to student human rights. The Seoul ordinance mandates that basic human rights must be upheld even if they are not specified in the ordinance.

The ordinances state that each city and province must stay up to date ensuring human rights. The city of Gwangju conducts a survey every two years to keep its human rights plan up to date. In Gyeonggi-do, the Superintendent of Public Instruction conducts an annual survey on student human rights. In Seoul, the Superintendent conducts an annual survey on the actual conditions of student human rights and reflect the results in the drafting of the comprehensive human rights plan for students. In Jeollabuk-do, the Chancellor conducts a survey on the condition of student human rights every year to reflect them in the education of human rights of students.

See also 
 ASUNARO: Action for Youth Rights of Korea
 Solidarity for LGBT Human Rights of Korea
 Seoul Ordinance of Student Rights

References

External links 
 Gyeonggi Student Human Rights Ordinance, National Legislation Information Center 
 Gwangju Student Human Rights Ordinance, National Legislation Information Center 
 Seoul Student Human Rights Ordinance, National Legislation Information Center 
 Jeollabuk-do Province Student Human Rights Ordinance, National Legislation Information Center 

Ordinance in South Korea
Juvenile law
Students in South Korea
Student rights